The 2013–14 Mestis season was the 14th season of the Mestis, the second level of ice hockey in Finland. 12 teams participated in the league.

Regular season

Playoffs

SM-Liiga promotion
Vaasan Sport was promoted to SM-liiga at the end of the season.

Qualification
Due to Sport gaining a place in the Liiga there were no qualifications and the winner of Suomi-sarja was allowed to apply for a place in Mestis for the next season.

External links
 Official website

References

Fin
2013–14 in Finnish ice hockey
Mestis seasons